The 53rd New York State Legislature, consisting of the New York State Senate and the New York State Assembly, met from January 5 to April 20, 1830, during the second year of Enos T. Throop's governorship, in Albany.

Background
Under the provisions of the New York Constitution of 1821, 32 senators were elected on general tickets in eight senatorial districts for four-year terms. They were divided into four classes, and every year eight Senate seats came up for election. Assemblymen were elected countywide on general tickets to a one-year term, the whole Assembly being renewed annually.

State Senator Robert Bogardus resigned on May 4, 1829, leaving a vacancy in the First District.

At this time, there were three political parties: the "Jacksonians" (supporting President Andrew Jackson; led by U.S. Secretary of State Martin Van Buren), the "Anti-Jacksonians" (the former supporters of John Quincy Adams, opposing Jackson and the Albany Regency), and the "Anti-Masons". In New York City, a Workingmen's Party appeared, and polled a large number of votes, winning a seat in the Assembly. In 1830, the Anti-Jacksonians re-organized as the National Republican Party (supporting Henry Clay for the presidency).

Elections
The state election was held from November 2 to 4, 1829. Alpheus Sherman, Jonathan S. Conklin (both 1st D.), Nathaniel P. Tallmadge (2nd D.), William Dietz (3rd D.), Isaac Gere (4th D.), Alvin Bronson (5th D.), Levi Beardsley (6th D.), Albert H. Tracy (8th D.) and Assemblyman Thomas Armstrong (7th D.) were elected to the Senate. Tracy was an Anti-Mason; the other eight were Jacksonians.

Sessions
The legislature met for the regular session at the Old State Capitol in Albany on January 5, 1830, and adjourned on April 20.

Erastus Root (J) was again elected Speaker, receiving 93 votes against 30 for Francis Granger (A-M); and William M. Oliver (J) was elected president pro tempore of the State Senate.

On January 8, Conklin and Sherman drew lots to decide which one of the two senators elected in the 1st District would serve the short term, and which one the full term. Conklin drew the short term, and Sherman the full term.

On February 12, the legislature re-elected State Treasurer Abraham Keyser, Jr. (J).

On April 13, a caucus of Jacksonian legislators, chaired by President pro tem William M. Oliver, resolved to call a state convention, to meet on September 8 at Herkimer, to nominate candidates for governor and lieutenant governor.

On April 16, a meeting of working men at the Old State Capitol in Albany nominated Speaker Erastus Root for governor. Root did neither accept nor decline the nomination for the time being, expecting either to be nominated by Jacksonians and decline, or to be slighted by the Jacksonians and accept. In June, a meeting of the Workingmen's Party at New York City endorsed the Albany nomination, but asked Root to state his position. Root declined, stating that he would support the Jacksonian nominee. The Workingmen then nominated Ezekiel Williams for governor, and Isaac S. Smith for lieutenant governor.

The Anti-Masonic state convention met in August at Utica, and nominated Assemblyman Francis Granger for governor, and Samuel Stevens, of New York City, for lieutenant governor.

The Jacksonian state convention met on September 8 at Herkimer and nominated Gov. Throop for re-election, and Edward P. Livingston for lieutenant governor.

State Senate

Districts
 The First District (4 seats) consisted of Kings, New York, Queens, Richmond and Suffolk counties.
 The Second District (4 seats) consisted of Delaware, Dutchess, Orange, Putnam, Rockland, Sullivan, Ulster and Westchester counties.
 The Third District (4 seats) consisted of Albany, Columbia, Greene, Rensselaer, Schenectady and Schoharie counties.
 The Fourth District (4 seats) consisted of Clinton, Essex, Franklin, Hamilton, Montgomery, St. Lawrence, Saratoga, Warren and Washington counties.
 The Fifth District (4 seats) consisted of Herkimer, Jefferson, Lewis, Madison, Oneida and Oswego counties.
 The Sixth District (4 seats) consisted of Broome, Chenango, Cortland, Otsego, Steuben, Tioga and Tompkins counties.
 The Seventh District (4 seats) consisted of Cayuga, Onondaga, Ontario, Seneca, Wayne and Yates counties.
 The Eighth District (4 seats) consisted of Allegany, Cattaraugus, Chautauqua, Erie, Genesee, Livingston, Monroe, Niagara and Orleans counties.

Note: There are now 62 counties in the State of New York. The counties which are not mentioned in this list had not yet been established, or sufficiently organized, the area being included in one or more of the abovementioned counties.

Members
The asterisk (*) denotes members of the previous Legislature who continued in office as members of this Legislature. Thomas Armstrong changed from the Assembly to the Senate.

Employees
 Clerk: John F. Bacon

State Assembly

Districts

 Albany County (3 seats)
 Allegany County (1 seat)
 Broome County (1 seat)
 Cattaraugus County (1 seat)
 Cayuga County (4 seats)
 Chautauqua County (2 seats)
 Chenango County (3 seats)
 Clinton County (1 seat)
 Columbia County (3 seats)
 Cortland County (2 seats)
 Delaware County (2 seats)
 Dutchess County (4 seats)
 Erie County (2 seats)
 Essex County (1 seat)
 Franklin County (1 seat)
 Genesee County (3 seats)
 Greene County (2 seats)
 Hamilton and Montgomery counties (3 seats)
 Herkimer County (3 seats)
 Jefferson County (3 seats)
 Kings County (1 seat)
 Lewis County (1 seat)
 Livingston County (2 seats)
 Madison County (3 seats)
 Monroe County (3 seats)
 The City and County of New York (11 seats)
 Niagara County (1 seat)
 Oneida County (5 seats)
 Onondaga County (4 seats)
 Ontario County (3 seats)
 Orange County (3 seats)
 Orleans County (1 seat)
 Oswego County (1 seat)
 Otsego County (4 seats)
 Putnam County (1 seat)
 Queens County (1 seat)
 Rensselaer County (4 seats)
 Richmond County (1 seat)
 Rockland County (1 seat)
 St. Lawrence County (2 seats)
 Saratoga County (3 seats)
 Schenectady County (1 seat)
 Schoharie County (2 seats)
 Seneca County (2 seats)
 Steuben County (2 seats)
 Suffolk County (2 seats)
 Sullivan County (1 seat)
 Tioga County (2 seats)
 Tompkins County (3 seats)
 Ulster County (2 seats)
 Warren County (1 seat)
 Washington (3 seats)
 Wayne County (2 seats)
 Westchester County (3 seats)
 Yates County (1 seat)

Note: There are now 62 counties in the State of New York. The counties which are not mentioned in this list had not yet been established, or sufficiently organized, the area being included in one or more of the abovementioned counties.

Assemblymen
The asterisk (*) denotes members of the previous legislature who continued as members of this legislature.

The party affiliations follow the vote on state treasurer on February 12, and the participation in the Jacksonian caucus on April 13.

Employees
 Clerk: Francis Seger
 Sergeant-at-Arms: James D. Scollard
 Doorkeeper: Alonzo Crosby
 Assistant Doorkeeper: Oliver Scovil

Notes

Sources
 The New York Civil List compiled by Franklin Benjamin Hough (Weed, Parsons and Co., 1858) [pg. 109 and 441 for Senate districts; pg. 128 for senators; pg. 148f for Assembly districts; pg. 209f for assemblymen]
 The History of Political Parties in the State of New-York, from the Ratification of the Federal Constitution to 1840 by Jabez D. Hammond (4th ed., Vol. 2, Phinney & Co., Buffalo, 1850; pg. 315 to 336)

053
1830 in New York (state)
1830 U.S. legislative sessions